The 1946 Boston University Terriers football team was an American football team that represented Boston University as an independent during the 1946 college football season. In its second season under head coach Walt Holmer, the team compiled a 5–2–1 record.

Boston University ranked 14th nationally among small-college teams with an average of 260.1 yards per game in total offense. It also ranked 13th nationally in total defense, giving up an average of 161.9 yards per game.

Schedule

References

Boston University
Boston University Terriers football seasons
Boston University Terriers football